Jean-Jacques Keller (1635–1700) and his brother Jean-Balthazar Keller (1638–1702) were Swiss gunfounders from Zürich, in the service of France.

Jean-Jacques was considered one of the most skillful founders of France. In 1669, he became "Master of the foundries" (Commissaire des Fontes) at Douai. He also established other foundries in Besançon, Breisach and Pinerolo. His work was integral part of the plan established by Louvois in 1666 to have the army and artillery reorganized.

His brother Jean-Balthasar was rather involved with the founding of statues. He famously founded the statue of Louis XIV then located in the Place Vendôme, in December 1692, in a single piece, something never achieved before. The statue was destroyed during the French Revolution on 10 August 1792.

Jean-Jacques met with trouble when some of his guns burst in 1694. He was then replaced by his brother Jean-Balthasar as Commissaire des Fontes at Douai.

The two brothers had a great influence on cannon founding techniques in France, and made thousands of artillery pieces.

The technology they employed, involving the founding of cannons around a plaster core, was superseded by the De Vallière system in 1732.

See also

Notes

Gallery

Artillery of France
People from Zürich
1635 births
1700 deaths